The Madison Monsters were a minor professional ice hockey team in the United Hockey League (UHL) based in Madison, Wisconsin, with home games in the Dane County Memorial Coliseum. The city of Madison was granted the franchise before the 1995–96 Colonial Hockey League (CoHL) season along with the Quad City Mallards.  The Monsters were the first CoHL hockey team to be established in Wisconsin. The CoHL rebranded as the United Hockey League in 1997.

The team moved to Knoxville, Tennessee, as the Knoxville Speed before the 1999–2000 season by team owner Andrew Wilhelm. The Monsters were replaced in Madison the following season by a UHL expansion team, the Madison Kodiaks, but only lasted one season before also relocating.

References

External links
 Madison Monsters statistics at HockeyDB

Defunct United Hockey League teams
Defunct ice hockey teams in the United States
Sports in Madison, Wisconsin
Ice hockey teams in Wisconsin
1995 establishments in Wisconsin
Ice hockey clubs established in 1995
1996 disestablishments in Wisconsin
Ice hockey clubs disestablished in 1996